Agnes Cathinka Wilhelmine Lunn (16 March 1850 – 12 December 1941) was a Danish painter and sculptor.

Biography
Lunn was born as a daughter to Villars Knudsen L. and Frederikke Amalie Hagen at Rønnebæksholm. She drew horses as a child and was fascinated by the form and movements of animals, leading her to the art of sculpture. A spinster, she died at Sønder Jernløse in 1941.

She was a student of F. C. Lund and Otto Bache in Denmark. She also studied in Paris under J.-L. Gérôme, Leon Bonnat, and J. Bastien-Lepage. She attended the art school for women at the Royal Danish Academy of Fine Arts and travelled to Paris, Greece, Italy, the Netherlands, Belgium, and Iceland.

Lunn has exhibited her works at, e.g., the spring exhibition at Charlottenborg, at the Women's Exhibition in Copenhagen and at the National Exhibition of 1909 in Aarhus. A small exhibition with sculptures and paintings by Lunn was held at the David Collection in Copenhagen in 2016.

Among her sculptures, Hamlette (bronze statuette, 1899), Two Swimming Horses  (bronze statuette, 1906, David Collection), and Resting Cow (1913, the Museum at Sønderborg Castle) could be mentioned.

References 

1850 births
1941 deaths
Danish sculptors
Danish women artists
19th-century Danish painters
20th-century Danish painters
20th-century sculptors
19th-century sculptors
19th-century Danish women artists
20th-century Danish women artists
20th-century Danish artists